John James McKenzie (born 19 August 1908, date of death unknown) was an Australian rules footballer who played with Essendon in the Victorian Football League (VFL).

Family
The son of Essendon, Brunswick, and Melbourne footballer, John Joseph "Dookie" McKenzie (1881–1946), and Mary Ellen McKenzie (1886-1918), née McCann, John James McKenzie was born at Brunswick, Victoria on 19 August 1908.

He married Lorna Mavis Ireland (1912-) on 29 April 1933. They were divorced in 1939.

Football
Recruited from Geelong Seconds as a half-forward or centreman, "he was hailed as a potential champion but did not fulfil this early promise".

He played five consecutive games for Essendon in 1929: the first against South Melbourne, at Windy Hill, on 25 May 1929, and the last against Melbourne at Windy Hill, on 29 June 1929.

Notes

References 
 Maplestone, M., Flying Higher: History of the Essendon Football Club 1872–1996, Essendon Football Club, (Melbourne), 1996.

External links 

	

1908 births
Year of death missing
Australian rules footballers from Melbourne
Essendon Football Club players
People from Brunswick, Victoria